is a Japanese football player for ReinMeer Aomori.

Club statistics
Updated to 23 February 2018.

References

External links

Profile at Fukushima United FC
Profile at ReinMeer Aomori

1993 births
Living people
Association football people from Hokkaido
Japanese footballers
J1 League players
J2 League players
J3 League players
Japan Football League players
Hokkaido Consadole Sapporo players
AC Nagano Parceiro players
Fukushima United FC players
J.League U-22 Selection players
ReinMeer Aomori players
Association football defenders
Sportspeople from Sapporo